Gregory Benko (born 9 October 1952) is a retired Australian foil fencer who competed at four Olympic Games.

After participating in the 1972 Summer Olympics, Benko was recruited as a member of the Wayne State University men's fencing team. He earned three varsity letters and three national championships in individual foil (1974, 1975, and 1976), a record at the time. Benko participated in several international tournaments over the years, notably winning the 1975 Martini & Rossi Invitational in New York and the 1982 Paris Invitational, and earning the gold medal in foil and épée at the 1978 British Commonwealth Games. He also participated in the 1976, 1980 and 1984 Summer Olympic Games. Benko was a finalist at the 1976 Montreal Olympics, the only Australian fencer to achieve that feat. He was the last (and only second) fencer to win all three Australian open national titles (foils, épée, sabre) in the one year.

References

Living people
1952 births
Australian male fencers
Wayne State University alumni
Olympic fencers of Australia
Fencers at the 1972 Summer Olympics
Fencers at the 1976 Summer Olympics
Fencers at the 1980 Summer Olympics
Fencers at the 1984 Summer Olympics
Commonwealth Games medallists in fencing
Commonwealth Games silver medallists for Australia
Commonwealth Games bronze medallists for Australia
Fencers at the 1970 British Commonwealth Games
Medallists at the 1970 British Commonwealth Games